This is a list of all the United States Supreme Court cases from volume 316 of the United States Reports:

External links

1942 in United States case law